Fay's Drug was a chain of drug stores that was founded in 1958 in Fairmount, New York. At its height, Fay's Drugs operated its core business, along with Wheels Discount Auto and The Paper Cutter Books and Office and Party Supply.

History

Beginning

In 1958, the first Fay's Drug Store was opened in Fairmount, New York by Henry A. Panasci, Jr. and his father Henry Panasci Sr. The store was named after Faye Panasci, wife of Henry Panasci, Jr.

Fay's steadily grew in Central New York—the resulting Fay's Drugs Company, Inc. was incorporated on October 20, 1966 and Fay's Drugs opened its headquarters in  Syracuse, New York with the bulk of its operations residing in Liverpool, New York. At its peak there were over 300 stores operating in New York and Northeast Pennsylvania. Fay's enjoyed #1 market share in Buffalo, Rochester, Syracuse and Albany.

Acquisitions
In 1979 Fay's acquired the Key Drug store chain in Rochester, NY and converted them to Fay's; further expanding their Rochester area market.

In 1991, Fay's Drugs acquired the 48 drug stores operated by Victory Markets as Carls Drugs. Carls Drugs was founded by Carl Panasci, brother and uncle to the Fay's Drugs founders.

Divestures
In the mid-1990s, Fay's Drugs decide to divest itself of its non-core subsidiaries. The company closed nine under-performing stores in its Paper Cutter subsidiary in April 1993. In 1996, the company sold its remaining 29 Paper Cutter stores to Long Island-based Party Experience Inc., a chain of party- and holiday-oriented supply stores, which converted the Paper Cutter stores to the Party Experience format the following year.

In December 1995, the company sold its Wheels Discount Auto Supply subsidiary with its 82 auto parts stores in New York and Pennsylvania to the Sears-owned Western Auto Supply for $37 million.

JCPenney
In 1996, Fay's Drugs was sold to JCPenney for $285 million in stock. JCPenney merged its drug operations into Eckerd in 1997. Many of the original Fay's Drugs locations that have not been closed in favor of stand-alone Eckerd stores (many now Rite Aid and Walgreens locations) still feature the familiar Fay's aisle and pharmacy formats that served as models for drug chains nationwide.

References

External links
UB to Award Posthumous Degree to Henry A. Panasci
The Panasci Panache
Wheels Discount Auto Supply, Inc. sold to Western Auto (Sears)
Paper Cutter - Hard Lines - company profile

Rite Aid
Defunct pharmacies of the United States
Defunct companies based in Syracuse, New York
American companies established in 1958
Retail companies established in 1958
Retail companies disestablished in 1997
Defunct companies based in New York (state)
1958 establishments in New York (state)
1997 disestablishments in New York (state)
Health care companies based in New York (state)